Ordo Rosarius Equilibrio (ORE) is a neofolk and martial industrial music group from Stockholm. The band is composed of its founding member and vocalist Tomas Pettersson, and Rose-Marie Larsen, who replaced Chelsea Krook on backup vocals. In 2008 Fredrik Leijström and Ronnie Bäck joined the band on bass and guitar.

Biography
In 1993, following the discontinuation of Tomas Pettersson's previous band, Archon Satani, he decided to start a new project. This project was initially called Ordo Equilibrio and joined by Chelsea Krook, his then-girlfriend. Together they made three full-length releases and one 7".

In 2001 the band had a change in line-up; Chelsea Krook was replaced by Rose-Marie Larsen. This also spawned a change in the bandname; the word Rosarius was added. The group has so far released eight albums, one 10" and a split album with Spiritual Front.

Style
The band's musical style has been described as "apocalyptic pop", a neofolk subgenre.  The name Ordo Rosarius Equilibrio can be translated either as "Rose Order in Equilibrium" or "...for Equilibrium" or "...through Equilibrium"  (due to the ambiguity of the Latin form 'equilibrio'). The usage of Latin alludes to the naming conventions of various religious societies.

In its strident, contemplative, or sombre lyrics, Ordo Rosarius Equilibrio combines seemingly incompatible polarities, such as "creation and destruction, dark and light, joy and sorrow, sex and war",.  The ontology of the pair could be accurately characterised as philosophically Luciferian or Epicurean (often incorporating Christian/Catholic, or Thelemic themes but permuted idiosyncratically).  Other areas of focus include the modern experience of present-day Europeans, kink/BDSM, parallels between cycles of nature and the human experience, and anomie.  For example, the album Cocktails, Carnage, Crucifixion And Pornography used the initials CCCP -- Latin characters that appear identical to the abbreviation in Cyrillic for the former Soviet Union—but modified [in the band's analysis of 2003] to indicate what Russia was becoming known for at that time (according to interviews from that period).

Further sources of inspiration include Aleister Crowley, William Blake, the bands Depeche Mode, Laibach, SPK, Death In June, Current 93, Coil, writers Daniil Kharms and Ayn Rand and filmmakers Tinto Brass and Andrew Blake.

In the initial years, the band incorporated sadomasochism live on stage as well.

A wide range of instruments are used, including acoustic guitars, percussion and piano, together with various sound-aggregating devices combined with projected imagery. Lyrics are delivered, typically by Petterson himself, in a performance including spoken word and traditional song.

Discography

References

External links
 Ordo Rosarius Equilibrio official web site

Swedish musical groups
Musical groups established in 1993
1993 establishments in Sweden